Leptospermum  is a genus of shrubs and small trees in the myrtle family Myrtaceae commonly known as tea trees, although this name is sometimes also used for some species of Melaleuca. Most species are endemic to Australia, with the greatest diversity in the south of the continent, but some are native to other parts of the world, including New Zealand and Southeast Asia. Leptospermums all have five conspicuous petals and five groups of stamens which alternate with the petals. There is a single style in the centre of the flower and the fruit is a woody capsule. 

The first formal description of a leptospermum was published in 1776 by the German botanists Johann Reinhold Forster and his son Johann Georg Adam Forster, but an unambiguous definition of individual species in the genus was not achieved until 1979. Leptospermums grow in a wide range of habitats but are most commonly found in moist, low-nutrient soils. They have important uses in horticulture, in the production of honey and in floristry.

Description
Plants in the genus Leptospermum range in size from prostrate shrubs to small trees, and have fibrous, flaky or papery bark. The leaves are arranged alternately and are relatively small, rigid and often aromatic when crushed. The flowers may be solitary or in groups, and have bracteoles and sepals which in most species fall off as the flower opens. There are five spreading, conspicuous petals which are white, pink or red. There are many stamens which are usually shorter than the petals and in five groups opposite the stamens, although they often appear not to be grouped. A simple style usually arises from a small depression in the ovary which has from three to five sections in most species, each section containing a few to many ovules. The fruit is a woody capsule which opens at the top to release the seeds, although in some species this does not occur until the plant, or the part of it, dies.

Taxonomy and naming
The first formal description of a leptospermum was published by Johann Reinhold Forster and Johann Georg Adam Forster in their 1776 book, Characteres Generum Plantarum. In 1876, George Bentham described twenty species, but noted the difficulty of discriminating between species. ("The species are very difficult to discriminate.") Of the species he named, only ten remain as valid.

In 1979, Barbara Briggs and Laurie Johnson published a classification of the family Myrtaceae in the Proceedings of the Linnean Society of New South Wales. Although there have been revisions to their groupings, their paper allowed a systematic examination of species in the genus Leptospermum. In 1989, Joy Thompson published a complete revision of the genus. In 2000, O'Brien et al. published yet another revision, using matK-based evidence to suggest that Leptospermum is polyphyletic, and should be split into persistent, Western non-persistent, and Eastern non-persistent fruiting plants, with Leptospermum spinescens as an outlier. However, neither phylogeny has been universally accepted. Current estimates recognize about ninety species of Leptospermum.

The common name tea tree derives from the practice of early Australian settlers who soaked the leaves of several species in boiling water to make a herbal tea.

Distribution and habitat
Most Leptospermum species are endemic to Australia where most are found in southern areas of the country. They are most common in moist, nutrient-poor soils although they sometimes occupy other situations. Leptospermum laevigatum is usually found growing on beach sand and L. riparium growing in Tasmanian rainforest on the edges of rivers. Leptospermum amboinense extends from Queensland to Southeast Asia and three species, L. javanicum, L. parviflorum and L. recurvum are endemic to southeast Asia. L. recurvum is only found on Mount Kinabalu in Sabah. Leptospermum scoparium is one of the most widespread in the genus and occurs in New South Wales, Victoria, Tasmania and New Zealand, where it is one of the most widespread and important native shrub species.

Ecology
In Australia, Leptospermum species are sometimes used as food plants by the larvae of hepialid moths of the genus Aenetus, including A. lewinii and A. ligniveren. These burrow horizontally into the trunk then vertically down.

Uses

Use in horticulture
Most Leptospermum species make desirable garden plants. They tolerate most soils, but many suppliers specify ericaceous (i.e. lime-free) compost with good drainage and full sun. Established plants are drought tolerant. They are often found as hedge plants on the west coast of the United States, and some species are popular for cultivation as bonsai. Many cultivars exist.

Use in floristry
These flowers are also grown in double cultivars and are used in floral designs. However, they do not last when out of water and the single flowers do not last when wired. The 'Pacific Beauty' (Leptospermum polygalifolium) is a useful flower to use in large church-service bowls and function arrangements, however use of Leptospermum in corporate designs is less desirable as they dry and drop when subjected to heating and air conditioning.

Honey production
The nectar from the flowers is harvested by bees, yielding Leptospermum honey, which is marketed as Manuka honey. Honey produced from Australian Leptospermum polygalifolium is also known as jelly bush or the lemon-scented tea tree.

Species
The following is a list of species accepted by the Australian Plant Census as at March 2020, apart from two species (L. javanicum and L. recurvum) only occurring outside Australia that are accepted by the Royal Botanic Gardens, Kew:

Leptospermum amboinense Blume - Qld, Malesia 
Leptospermum anfractum A.R.Bean - Qld
Leptospermum arachnoides Gaertn. spidery tea-tree - Qld, NSW
Leptospermum argenteum Joy Thomps. Mt Royal tea-tree - NSW
Leptospermum barneyense A.R.Bean - Qld
Leptospermum benwellii A.R.Bean - NSW
Leptospermum blakelyi Joy Thomps. - NSW
Leptospermum brachyandrum (F.Muell.) Druce - Qld, NSW 
Leptospermum brevipes F.Muell. slender tea-tree - Qld, NSW, Vic
Leptospermum brevipes F.Muell. × Leptospermum microcarpum Cheel - Qld
Leptospermum confertum Joy Thomps. - WA
Leptospermum continentale Joy Thomps. prickly tea-tree - NSW, Vic, SA
Leptospermum coriaceum (F.Muell.) Cheel green tea-tree, mallee teatree - NSW, Vic, SA
Leptospermum crassifolium Joy Thomps. - NSW
Leptospermum deanei Joy Thomps. - NSW
Leptospermum deuense Joy Thomps. - NSW
Leptospermum divaricatum Schauer - NSW
Leptospermum emarginatum H.L.Wendl. ex Link  - NSW, Vic
Leptospermum epacridoideum Cheel - NSW
Leptospermum erubescens Schauer - WA
Leptospermum exsertum Joy Thomps. - WA 
Leptospermum fastigiatum S.Moore - WA, SA
Leptospermum glabrescens N.A.Wakef. - Vic
Leptospermum glaucescens S.Schauer - Tas
Leptospermum grandiflorum Lodd. G.Lodd. & W.Lodd. - Tas
Leptospermum grandifolium Sm. - NSW, Vic  
Leptospermum gregarium Joy Thomps.  - Qld, NSW 
Leptospermum incanum Turcz. - WA 
Leptospermum inelegans Joy Thomps. - WA  
Leptospermum javanicum Blume - Myanmar, Thailand, Malaysia, Indonesia, Philippines 
Leptospermum jingera Lyne & Crisp - Vic
Leptospermum juniperinum Sm. - Qld, NSW 
Leptospermum laevigatum (Gaertn.) F.Muell. - NSW, Vic, SA, Tas
Leptospermum lamellatum Joy Thomps. - Qld  
Leptospermum lanigerum (Sol. ex Aiton) Sm. - Qld, NSW, Vic, SA, Tas
Leptospermum liversidgei R.T.Baker & H.G.Sm.  - Qld, NSW  
Leptospermum luehmannii F.M.Bailey - Qld, NSW
Leptospermum macgillivrayi Joy Thomps. - WA
Leptospermum macrocarpum (Maiden & Betche) Joy Thomps. - NSW
Leptospermum madidum A.R.Bean - Qld, WA, NT
Leptospermum madidum A.R.Bean subsp. madidum - Qld
Leptospermum madidum subsp. sativum A.R.Bean - WA, NT 
Leptospermum maxwellii S.Moore -  WA
Leptospermum microcarpum Cheel - Qld, NSW
Leptospermum micromyrtus Miq. - NSW, Vic 
Leptospermum minutifolium C.T.White - Qld, NSW
Leptospermum morrisonii Joy Thomps. - NSW 
Leptospermum multicaule A.Cunn. - NSW, ACT, Vic 
Leptospermum myrsinoides Schltdl. - NSW, Vic, SA
Leptospermum myrtifolium Sieber ex DC. - NSW, ACT, Vic 
Leptospermum namadgiense Lyne - NSW, ACT
Leptospermum neglectum Joy Thomps. - Qld
Leptospermum nitens Turcz. - WA
Leptospermum nitidum Hook.f. - Tas 
Leptospermum novae-angliae Joy Thomps. - Qld, NSW  
Leptospermum obovatum Sweet - NSW, Vic
Leptospermum oligandrum Turcz.  - WA
Leptospermum oreophilum Joy Thomps. - Qld  
Leptospermum pallidum A.R.Bean - Qld  
Leptospermum parvifolium Sm. - Qld, NSW 
Leptospermum petersonii F.M.Bailey - Qld, NSW 
Leptospermum petraeum Joy Thomps. - NSW
Leptospermum polyanthum Joy Thomps. - NSW  
Leptospermum polygalifolium Salisb. - Qld, NSW, Lord Howe Island
 Leptospermum polygalifolium subsp. cismontanum Joy Thomps. - Qld, NSW
 Leptospermum polygalifolium subsp. howense Joy Thomps. - Lord Howe Island
 Leptospermum polygalifolium subsp. montanum Joy Thomps.
 Leptospermum polygalifolium Salisb. subsp. polygalifolium - NSW
Leptospermum polygalifolium subsp. transmontanum Joy Thomps. - Qld, NSW
Leptospermum polygalifolium subsp. tropicum Joy Thomps. - Qld
Leptospermum purpurascens Joy Thomps. - Qld 
Leptospermum recurvum Hook.f. - Sabah, Sulawesi 
Leptospermum riparium D.I.Morris - Tas 
Leptospermum roei Benth. - WA
Leptospermum rotundifolium (Maiden & Betche) F.A.Rodway - NSW
Leptospermum rupestre Hook.f. - Tas
Leptospermum rupicola Joy Thomps. - NSW 
Leptospermum scoparium J.R.Forst. & G.Forst. -  Vic, NSW, Tas, NZ 
Leptospermum sejunctum Joy Thomps. - NSW 
Leptospermum semibaccatum Cheel - Qld, NSW 
Leptospermum sericatum Lindl. - Qld
Leptospermum sericeum Labill. - WA
Leptospermum speciosum Schauer - Qld, NSW
Leptospermum spectabile Joy Thomps. - NSW
Leptospermum sphaerocarpum Cheel - NSW  
Leptospermum spinescens Endl. - WA
Leptospermum squarrosum Gaertn. - NSW 
Leptospermum subglabratum Joy Thomps. - NSW 
Leptospermum subtenue Joy Thomps. - WA 
Leptospermum thompsonii Joy Thomps. - NSW  
Leptospermum trinervium (Sm.) Joy Thomps. - Qld, NSW, Vic
Leptospermum turbinatum Joy Thomps. - Vic
Leptospermum variabile Joy Thomps. - Qld, NSW
Leptospermum venustum A.R.Bean - Qld  
Leptospermum whitei Cheel - Qld, NSW  
Leptospermum wooroonooran F.M.Bailey - Qld

References

 
Myrtaceae genera
Taxa named by Georg Forster